Old Warrick County Jail is a historic jail located in Boonville, Indiana.  It was built in 1877, and is a two-story, Italianate style red brick building.  It consists of the hipped roof former sheriff's residence at the front with the -story jail at the rear.

It was listed on the National Register of Historic Places in 1979.

References

Jails on the National Register of Historic Places in Indiana
Italianate architecture in Indiana
Government buildings completed in 1877
Buildings and structures in Warrick County, Indiana
National Register of Historic Places in Warrick County, Indiana
1877 establishments in Indiana